The , abbreviated as Nodai (農大, nōdai) or Tokyo nodai (東京農大, Tōkyō nōdai), is a private university of agriculture in Japan.

There are three campuses: Setagaya, Atsugi, and Okhotsk (Abashiri).

Outline 
Tokyo University of Agriculture is a private agriculture university. It was the first such institution founded in Japan. As of 2006 it is the only private university in Japan that specializes in agriculture. Although its name is similar to Tokyo University of Agriculture and Technology and the College of Agriculture at University of Tokyo, the institutions are not related to one another.

Including public agriculture universities, Tokyo University of Agriculture is ranked third, behind Sapporo Agricultural College and the University of Tokyo, Komaba Campus.

Faculties 
Tokyo campus in Setagaya-ku:
Faculty of Applied Bio-Science
Faculty of Regional Environmental Science
Faculty of International Agriculture and Food Studies

Atsugi campus in Kanagawa:
Faculty of Agriculture

Okhotsk campus in Hokkaido:
Faculty of Bio-industry

In addition, the university offers two graduate school programs: one in Agriculture and one in Bio-industry. There is a two-year junior college.

See also
 Tokyo University of Agriculture Botanical Garden

External links
 Tokyo University of Agriculture, English, official website

Agricultural universities and colleges
Private universities and colleges in Japan
Universities and colleges in Tokyo
Universities and colleges in Kanagawa Prefecture
Western Metropolitan Area University Association
Hokkaido American Football Association